T&T may refer to:

 Bangladesh Telegraph and Telephone Board, a state-owned telecommunication company
 T & T Supermarket, a supermarket chain in Canada
 Tackey & Tsubasa, a duo of Japanese pop singers
 Tonkin + Taylor, an environmental and engineering consultancy in New Zealand
 Trinidad and Tobago, a country in the Caribbean, consisting of the islands of Trinidad, Tobago and various smaller islands
 Tunnels & Trolls, a fantasy role-playing game
 Phoenix Wright: Ace Attorney − Trials and Tribulations, a visual novel adventure game by Capcom
T. and T., a 1987 Canadian television show starring Mr. T
 Another name for TNT (professional wrestling), a professional wrestling tag team

See also
 TNT (disambiguation)